West Indian Ocean Cable Company (WIOCC) operates as a wholesaler, providing capacity to international telecos, OTTs, Content Providers and internet service providers within and out of Africa. WIOCC's international network reach currently extends to 100 cities in 29 countries in Europe and more than 700 cities in 70 countries globally.

The company was established in 2008 and is jointly owned by 14 major African telecom operators, with support from five international development financial institutions: International Finance Corporation (IFC), African Development Bank (AfDB), French Development Bank (AFD), German Development Bank (KfW) and European Investment Bank (EIB).

WIOCC's CEO (from October 2008 – Present) is Chris Wood. WIOCC is registered in the Republic of Mauritius with offices in Nairobi, Kenya and Johannesburg, South Africa.

Shareholders
WIOCC is owned by 14 major African telcos. The shareholders are;

Botswana Fibre Networks - Botswana
Dalkom Somalia
Djibouti Telecom
Zantel - Tanzania
TelOne - Zimbabwe
ONATEL - Burundi
TMCEL
 Telkom Kenya
Uganda Telecom
Lesotho Communications Authority

Network
Eastern Africa Submarine Cable System (EASSy)

WIOCC is the largest shareholder in EASSy owning 28% of the capacity, a >10Tbit/s capacity submarine fibre-optic cable system interconnecting nine countries along the eastern seaboard to the rest of the world. Circuits on EASSy can be protected against cable breaks and equipment failures by choosing its ‘in system protection’ option, which reroutes affected traffic onto the EASSy collapsed ring in the event of failure.

The cable landing points are:
 Port Sudan, Sudan
 Djibouti
 Mogadishu, Somalia
 Mombasa, Kenya
 Moroni, Comoros
 Dar es Salaam, Tanzania
 Toliary, Madagascar
 Maputo,  Mozambique
 Mtunzini, South Africa

Through strategic investments in several major international submarine cables into Africa, the overall WIOCC network forms a  ‘ring’ around Africa. These cables include:

Europe India Gateway (EIG)

EIG is a 15,000 km with a design capacity of 28 Tbit/s connecting Africa's northern seaboard to Europe, the Middle East and India WIOCC has made a strategic investment in EIG to secure high capacity, high-speed onward connectivity from Djibouti for EASSy.

West Africa Cable System (WACS)

WACS is the largest submarine cable on Africa's western seaboard, with a design capacity of 14.5 Tbit/s and the largest submarine cable on Africa's western seaboard linking South Africa with the United Kingdom WIOCC has made a strategic investment in WACS. Circuits on WACS can be protected against cable breaks and equipment failures by choosing its ‘in system protection’ option, which reroutes affected traffic onto an alternative fibre pair in the event of a failure.

Telecom Egypt North (TE North)

TE North is a submarine telecommunications cable linking France and Egypt, a 3,100 km long with a capacity of up to 1.28 Tbit/s over 8 fibre pairs.

South East Asia–Middle East–Western Europe 5  (SEA-ME-WE 5)

SEA-ME-WE 5 is an optical fibre submarine communications cable system that carries telecommunications approximately 20,000 kilometres long with a design capacity of 24 Terabits per second between Singapore and France.

As well as serving Africa's coastal regions, WIOCC's terrestrial network links to these and other submarine fibre-optic cables and enables businesses and individuals in landlocked countries - such as Lesotho, Zimbabwe, Burundi, Malawi, Rwanda and Uganda to take advantage of cost-effective international connectivity.

See also
 EASSy
 WACS (cable system)
 EIG (cable system)

References

Telecommunications in Africa
Internet in Africa
Telecommunications in Europe
Submarine communications cables in the Indian Ocean
Wide area networks